American singer Keyshia Cole has released seven studio albums, one extended play, two mixtapes, 24 singles (including 11 as a featured artist) and thirty-one music videos. Cole's debut single, "Never", peaked at number 71 on the United States Billboard Hot R&B/Hip-Hop Songs chart and became Cole's first entry on a national record chart. She was later featured on "Let's Get Blown", a 2004 single by American West Coast hip hop rapper Snoop Dogg – it peaked at number 54 on the US Billboard Hot 100. Cole released her debut album The Way It Is on June 21, 2005 through A&M Records. The album debuted at number six on the US Billboard 200, with first-week sales of 89,000 copies. The Way It Is was certified platinum by the Recording Industry Association of America (RIAA). It produced the four singles "I Changed My Mind", "(I Just Want It) To Be Over", "I Should Have Cheated", and "Love", of two of which reached the top ten of the Hot R&B/Hip-Hop Songs chart.

Cole's second studio album Just like You was released on September 25, 2007. It debuted at number two on the US Billboard 200, with first-week sales of 281,419 copies. Its lead single, "Let It Go", peaked at number seven on the Hot 100 and received a platinum certification from the RIAA. The album was certified platinum by the RIAA, and has since sold 1.7 million copies in the US. On December 16, 2008, she released her third studio album A Different Me in the United States. The album went on to sell 322,000 copies in its first week, becoming Cole's highest first-week sales of her career and was certified platinum by the RIAA. The album was supported by three singles: "Playa Cardz Right", "You Complete Me", and "Trust". In 2009, Billboard ranked Cole among the top ten of the Top R&B/Hip-Hop Artists of the 2000s.

Cole's fourth studio album Calling All Hearts was released on December 21, 2010, by Geffen Records. The album debuted at number nine on the Billboard 200, with first week sales of 129,000 copies. Cole's fifth studio album Woman to Woman was released November 19, 2012 through Geffen Records and Interscope Records. The album debuted at number ten on the Billboard 200, with first week sales of 96,000 copies. The album has sold 246,300 copies in the US as of January 2013. Cole's sixth studio album Point of No Return was released in 2014 and became her third album to debut at number one on the Top R&B/Hip-Hop Albums chart, as well as her sixth consecutive album to reach the top ten of the Billboard 200. Following a hiatus and a label shift to Epic Records, her seventh studio album 11:11 Reset was released in October 2017. The album spawned two singles "You" and "Incapable", of which both reached the top 20 of the Billboard Hot R&B Songs chart.

Albums

Studio albums

Mixtapes

Extended plays

Singles

As lead artist

As featured artist

Promotional singles

Other charted songs

Guest appearances

Notes

References

External links 
 
 

Discography
Discographies of American artists
Rhythm and blues discographies
Soul music discographies